This is a list of electricity-generating power stations in the U.S. state of Ohio, sorted by type and name.  In 2021, Ohio had a total summer capacity of 29,283 MW and a net generation of 125,948 GWh.  The corresponding electrical energy generation mix was 50.7% natural gas, 31.8% coal, 12.4% nuclear, 2.3% wind, 0.4% biomass, 0.4% hydroelectric, 0.7% solar, and 0.8% petroleum and petroleum coke.

Natural Gas

Coal

Nuclear

Wind

Solar

Hydroelectricity

Battery Storage

Closed plants

See also

List of power stations in the United States

References

Power stations
Ohio